The following lists events that happened during 1961 in the State of Kuwait.

Incumbents
Emir: Abdullah Al-Salim Al-Sabah

Events
 Kuwaiti Premier League was formed.

Births
 18 July - Abdallah Al Rowaished, singer.

See also
Years in Jordan
Years in Syria

References

 
Kuwait
Kuwait
Years of the 20th century in Kuwait
1960s in Kuwait